Utchili is a village in Atreyapuram Mandal, Dr. B.R. Ambedkar Konaseema district in the state of Andhra Pradesh in India.

Geography 

Demographics 
 India census, Utchili had a population of 2693, out of which 1317 were male and 1336 were female. The population of children below 6 years of age was 10%. The literacy rate of the village was 66%.

References 

Villages in Atreyapuram mandal